The Hamburger Meile was a Group 3 flat horse race in Germany open to thoroughbreds aged three years or older. It was run at Hamburg-Horn over a distance of 1,600 metres (about 1 mile), and was scheduled to take place each year in June or July.  

The race was last run at Hamburg-Horn in 2011, being moved to Hanover in 2012.  However a very similar event, the Group Two Meilen Trophy, was run at the same course only three weeks later, and this race and the Hamburger Stutenmeile (restricted to fillies and mares), has since been kept at the expense of the Hamburger  Meile.

History
The event was established in 1986, and it was initially called the Cognac Hennessy-Rennen. It was originally classed at Listed level and contested over 1,600 metres. It was extended to 1,800 metres in 1987, and reverted to 1,600 metres in 1989.

The race was known as the Hamburg Dresden-Pokal in the early 1990s. It lost Listed status in 1992, and had various sponsored titles thereafter.

The Hamburger Meile regained Listed status in 2000, and was promoted to Group 3 level in 2002. From this point it was called the Deutscher Herold-Preis. It was subsequently known as the JAXX-Pokal and the Franz-Günther von Gaertner-Gedachtnisrennen.

The race was held at Hanover under the title Grosser Preis der VGH Versicherungen in 2012.

Records
Most successful horse (2 wins):
 Power Flame – 1997, 1998
 Up and Away – 2001, 2003
 Earl of Fire – 2009, 2010

Leading jockey (2 wins):
 Georg Bocskai – Babylonier (1986), Caracobi (1987)
 Andreas Suborics – Sinyar (1995), El Divino (2000)
 Andrasch Starke – La Blue (1996), Sambaprinz (2004)
 Andreas Boschert – Power Flame (1997, 1998)
 Lennart Hammer-Hansen – Up and Away (2001, 2003)
 Dominique Boeuf – Earl of Fire (2009, 2010)

Leading trainer (4 wins):
 Bruno Schütz – Saphir (1988), Amarant (1993), Sinyar (1995), La Blue (1996)

Winners

 The 2012 running took place at Hanover.

See also
 List of German flat horse races

References
 Racing Post:
 
 galopp-sieger.de – Hamburger Meile.
 horseracingintfed.com – International Federation of Horseracing Authorities – Race Detail (2012).
 pedigreequery.com – Hamburger Meile – Hamburg.

Open mile category horse races
Horse races in Germany
Recurring sporting events established in 1986
Sports competitions in Hamburg